Mountfield may refer to:

Places
 Mountfield, East Sussex, England
 Mountfield, County Tyrone, Northern Ireland

People
 Derek Mountfield (born 1962), English former footballer
 Helen Mountfield (born 1967), British barrister and legal scholar,
 Robin Mountfield (1939–2011), British civil servant

Companies
 Mountfield (retailer), Czech retail chain

Sport

 HC Mountfield, a Czech Republic ice hockey club
 Mountfield HK, a Czech Republic ice hockey club
 MHC Mountfield, a Slovakian ice hockey club

See also
Mount Field (disambiguation)
Mountfields, Shrewsbury, England